Clemensia mesomima is a moth of the family Erebidae. It is found in Colombia.

References

Cisthenina
Moths described in 1914